Wrangell Island is an island in the Alexander Archipelago in the Alaska Panhandle of southeastern Alaska. Wrangell is separated from the mainland by the narrow Blake Channel.

The first European to sight the island was James Johnstone, one of George Vancouver’s officers during his 1791-1795 expedition, in 1793. He only charted its east coast, not realizing it was an island. It was occupied in 1834 by the Russians. It is named after Ferdinand Wrangel, a Baltic German explorer in Russian service, and government official. From 1867 to 1877 it was a U.S. military post; later it became an outfitting point for hunters and explorers, and for miners using the Stikine River route to the Yukon.

The island contains the city of Wrangell, Alaska. Wrangell Island is heavily forested and contains an abundance of wildlife. The only other community is Thoms Place on the southwest side, across the Zimovia Strait from Etolin Island. Wrangell Island's total population was 2,401 at the 2000 census.

Fishing and mining are pursued in the area. A lumber mill closed in the 1990s. The island and surrounding areas contain many recreational areas. It is at the mouth of the Stikine River, which provides many recreational opportunities.

References

Wrangell Island: 1002 thru 1017, Block Group 1; Block Groups 2 thru 4; Census Tract 3, Wrangell-Petersburg Census Area, Alaska United States Census Bureau

External links 

   Blue Book of Boats Cruising Destinations- Wrangell, Alaska

Islands of the Alexander Archipelago
Islands of Wrangell, Alaska
Islands of Alaska